Carex feta, the green-sheathed sedge or greensheath sedge, is a species of flowering plant in the family Cyperaceae, native to southwestern British Columbia in Canada, and Washington, Oregon, and California in the United States. Its chromosome number is n=33.

References

feta
Flora of British Columbia
Flora of Washington (state)
Flora of Oregon
Flora of California
Plants described in 1893